The Western States Football League (WSFL) is a defunct American junior college football league for schools in the states of Arizona, Idaho, New Mexico and Utah that existed from 1985 to 2018. The league was part of the National Junior College Athletic Association.

History
Originally formed in 1985, the WSFL initially consisted of ten schools, six from the Arizona Community College Conference (ACCAC) and four from the Intermountain Collegiate Athletic Conference (ICAC). The founding members were:

Over the years a number of schools have entered and left the league. In 1988, Eastern Utah cancelled its football program and left the league. Its place was taken in 1993 by New Mexico Military Institute. Eastern Arizona left the WSFL in 1994, but rejoined the following year. New Mexico Military left the league in 1996, but rejoined in 2001. Pima Community College also joined the WSFL in 2001. In 2002, Ricks College cancelled all sports and left the WSFL, after changing its name to Brigham Young University–Idaho. Finally, in 2006, Dixie State left the league when the school moved to the NCAA Division II level.

New Mexico Military left the WSFL for the Southwest Junior College Football Conference following the 2015 season.

All of the schools in Arizona canceled football following the 2018 season, leaving only Snow College, which is now an NJCAA independent.

Former Members

Championships
 Phoenix College won the NJCAA National Football Championship in 1964.
 Arizona Western College won the NJCAA National Football Championship in 1972.
 Mesa Community College won the NJCAA National Football Championship in 1973 and 1975.
 Snow College won the NJCAA National Football Championship in 1985.
 Glendale Community College won the NJCAA National Football Championship in 1988, 2000 and 2005.

External links
 WSFL official website – Outdated
 WSFL Info website
 

NJCAA conferences
College football-only conferences in the United States